Aleksandar Gluvačević (born September 8, 1997) is an American professional soccer player who plays as a forward for Des Moines Menace in USL League Two.

Career 
Gluvačević played in Florida with the IMG Academy and had committed to playing college soccer at Florida Atlantic University in 2015. However, he instead opted to move to Serbia, the birthplace of his parents.

Serbia 
In 2015, Gluvačević signed with Serbian SuperLiga team Rad but saw his game time limited to the youth team as the club ran into issues and were unable to register him to play for the first team. He won the youth league title with Rad. Ahead of the 2016–17 season, Gluvačević moved to third-tier side Dorćol and was eventually registered to be able to play in official matches. He scored two goals in four appearances before making the switch to Dunav Stari Banovci and later Vršac, all of the third division.

United States 
In March 2020, Gluvačević returned to Florida to sign a professional contract with USL League One side Orlando City B ahead of the 2020 season. On August 1, 2020, he made his debut in the season opener against Tormenta FC, appearing as a 77th minute substitute in the 2–0 defeat. He scored his first goal for the club on October 24 in a 4–1 defeat to Greenville Triumph.

In 2022, Gluvačević joined Des Moines Menace of USL League Two.

References

External links 
Aleksandar Gluvačević at Orlando City

1997 births
American soccer players
Association football forwards
FK Dorćol players
Living people
Orlando City B players
Soccer players from Charlotte, North Carolina
USL League One players
American people of Serbian descent
Florida Atlantic Owls men's soccer players
American expatriate soccer players
Expatriate footballers in Serbia
American expatriate sportspeople in Serbia